Cathedral of Saint Michael, or St. Michael's Cathedral, may refer to:

India
 Cathedral of St. Michael and St. Joseph, in Shimla, Himachal Pradesh; a cathedral in India
 St. Michael's Cathedral, Coimbatore, in Tamil Nadu; a cathedral in India
 Cathedral of St. Michael, Raigarh, in Chhattisgarh; a cathedral in India
 Cathedral of St. Michael, Khunti, in Jharkhand; a cathedral in India
 St. Michael's Cathedral, Kodungallur, in Kerala; a cathedral in India
 St. Michael's Cathedral, Iligan City, Philippines
 St. Michael's Cathedral, Łomża, Poland
 St. Michael's Cathedral, Alba Iulia, Romania

Russia
 St. Michael's Cathedral (Izhevsk)
 Cathedral of the Archangel, Moscow
 Saint Michael's Cathedral, Sochi

Ukraine
 St. Michael's Cathedral (Cherkasy)
 St. Michael's Golden-Domed Monastery, Kyiv

United Kingdom
Cathedral of St Michael and St George, Aldershot, England
Coventry Cathedral (St Michael's Cathedral), Coventry, England

United States
St. Michael's Cathedral (Sitka, Alaska)
St. Michael's Episcopal Cathedral (Boise, Idaho)
St. Michael's Cathedral (Springfield, Massachusetts)
Cathedral of St. Michael the Archangel (Passaic, New Jersey)

Other countries
 St Michael's Cathedral, Wollongong, Australia
 Cathedral Church of Saint Michael and All Angels, Barbados
 St. Michael and Gudula Cathedral, Brussels, Belgium
 St. Michael's Cathedral (Toronto), Canada
 St. Michael's Cathedral, Qingdao, China
 St. Michel's Cathedral, Carcassonne, France
 St. Michael's Cathedral, Rikitea, French Polynesia
 St. Michael's Cathedral, Veszprém, Hungary
 Cathedral of St. Michael the Archangel, Albenga, Italy
 St. Michael's Cathedral, Belgrade, Serbia
 St Michael and St George Cathedral, Makhanda, South Africa

See also
Michaelion
Cathedral of St Michael and St George (disambiguation)
St. Michael's Church (disambiguation)
Saint Michael (disambiguation)
San Miguel Cathedral (disambiguation)

ru:Храм Архангела Михаила#Соборы